Tariq Bajwa is a retired Pakistani civil servant who served in BPS-22 grade as the Finance Secretary and Economic Affairs Secretary of Pakistan. Bajwa also served as the 19th Governor of the State Bank of Pakistan and the 20th Chairman of the Federal Board of Revenue. He is the only Pakistani who won the Littauer fellowship at Harvard University.  He also received a master's degree in Public Administration from the same institution. Bajwa is batchmates with Shehzad Arbab, Sajjad Saleem Hotiana and Babar Yaqoob Fateh Muhammad.

Career
Bajwa served as the Governor of the State Bank from 7 July 2017 up till he was asked to resign from the post on 3 May 2019. Prior to this, he served as a civil servant belonging to the Pakistan Administrative Service. He served as the Economic Affairs Secretary of Pakistan from November 2015 to February 2017, and as Finance Secretary of Pakistan from February 2017 to July 2017. He also remained the chairman of Federal Board of Revenue from July 2013 to October 2015.

He also previously served as Finance Secretary to the Government of Punjab and as Head of Pakistan’s Trade Mission in Los Angeles.

See also
Nasir Khosa
Fawad Hasan Fawad
Rizwan Ahmed
Nargis Sethi
Shamshad Akhtar

References

External links

Governors of the State Bank of Pakistan
Harvard Kennedy School alumni
Pakistani civil servants
Punjabi people